Xiaowu is a given name. Notable people with the name include:

 Emperor Xiaowu of Jin (362–396), an emperor of the Eastern Jin Dynasty (266–420) in China
 Emperor Xiaowu of Liu Song (430–464), an emperor of the Chinese dynasty Liu Song
 Emperor Xiaowu of Northern Wei (510–535), an emperor of the Chinese/Xianbei dynasty Northern Wei
 Empress Gao (Xiaowu), empress of the Chinese/Xianbei dynasty Northern Wei: her husband was Emperor Xiaowu
 Ruan Xiaowu, fictional character in the Water Margin, one of the four Great Classical Novels of Chinese literature